The A.N. Palmer Centre for Local Studies and Archives, or simply the Wrexham Archives, holds the archives for the city of Wrexham. The archives are held at County Buildings, on Regent Street, Wrexham, and run by Wrexham County Borough Council as part of its Wrexham Archives and Local Studies Service. The centre is named after local Wrexham historian Alfred Neobard Palmer.  The building is shared with Wrexham County Borough Museum and the archives opened in 2002.

Materials
Materials held at the centre include:
 Census returns 1841-1901 for Wrexham County Borough
 Census returns 1891-1901 for Denbighshire and Flintshire
 Census indexes 1881 for Wales, Cheshire, Lancashire and Shropshire
 National Probate Indexes for England and Wales 1858-1943
 Newspapers from 1850
 Parish registers for parishes in Wrexham County Borough
 Burgess rolls and Electoral Lists from 1857 (incomplete)
 Monumental Inscriptions
 Parish Register transcriptions
 Trade directories 1818-1974
 Books on the history of Wrexham County Borough
 1881 British Census and National Index for England, Wales and Scotland
 Cemetery Databases for Wrexham Cemetery 1876-2000  and Gresford Cemetery 1917-2000
 Internet access to genealogical sites and historical sites
 Ordnance Survey Maps dating from 1872 -1970s
 Tithe maps for parishes in Wrexham County Borough
 Alan Godfrey old maps covering NE Wales

References

Wrexham
History of Wales
Archives in Wales